The 2008 Memphis Tigers football team represented the University of Memphis in the 2008 NCAA Division I FBS football season. Memphis competed as a member of the Conference USA.  The team was led by head coach Tommy West. The Tigers played their home games at the Liberty Bowl Memorial Stadium. The Tigers finished the regular season with a 6–6 record, which was enough to attain bowl eligibility. Memphis accepted a bid to play against South Florida in the inaugural St. Petersburg Bowl in St. Petersburg, Florida. The Tigers lost, 41–14.

Schedule

Game summaries

Mississippi

Recap: Ole Miss tops Memphis to give Nutt win in debut

Rice

Recap: Rice 42, Memphis 35

Marshall

Recap: Memphis 16, Marshall 17

Nicholls State

Recap: Nicholls State 10, Memphis 31

Arkansas State

Recap: Memphis 29, Arkansas St. 17

Alabama-Birmingham

Recap: Memphis 33, UAB 30

Louisville

Recap: Louisville's offense lags, so special teams and defense pick up slack vs. Memphis

East Carolina

Recap: Memphis 10, East Carolina 30

Southern Mississippi

Recap: Steele (178 yards, 2 TDs) keys Memphis past Southern Miss

Southern Methodist

Recap: Memphis 31, SMU 26

Central Florida

Recap: UCF 28, Memphis 21

Tulane

Recap: Memphis 45, Tulane 6

South Florida (St. Petersburg Bowl)

Recap: Grothe throws for 236 yards, three TDs as South Florida dominates Memphis

References

External links
 2008 Memphis Tigers Football Media Guide, University of Memphis

Memphis
Memphis Tigers football seasons
Memphis Tigers football